The players auction for the 2013 Bangladesh Premier League was held on December 20, 2012 at the Radisson Blu Water Garden Hotel, Dhaka.  Domestic players were set a base price between $10,000 and $50,000, while international players were set a base price between $15,000 and $75,000.No Indian players included in 2013 BPL edition.

Player list

Domestic players
Domestic players within the top three categories for the auction are listed below:
Golden ($50,000): 

  Tamim Iqbal
  Shakib Al Hasan
  Mahmudullah
  Mushfiqur Rahim

Category A ($30,000): 

  Mohammad Ashraful
  Anamul Haque
  Nasir Hossain
  Shohag Gazi
  Ziaur Rahman
  Mashrafe Mortaza
  Abdur Razzak

Category B ($20,000): 

  Nazim Uddin
  Jahurul Islam
  Shahriar Nafees
  Zunaied Siddique
  Imrul Kayes
  Mominul Haque
  Alok Kapali
  Farhad Reza
  Naeem Islam
  Shahadat Hossain
  Rubel Hossain
  Shafiul Islam
  Abul Hasan
  Nazmul Hossain
  Elias Sunny
  Arafat Sunny
  Mosharraf Hossain
  Enamul Haque Jr

International players
International players in of the two top categories for the auction are listed below. Players with a strike through their name were withdrawn on the day of the auction. Yasir Arafat, Ryan ten Doeschate and Peter Trego were added to Category A on auction day.
Golden ($75,000):

  Shahid Afridi
  Saeed Ajmal
  Imran Nazir
  Luke Wright
  Owais Shah
  Dimitri Mascarenhas
  Tino Best
  Sunil Narine
  Dwayne Bravo
  Marlon Samuels
  Andre Russell
  Fidel Edwards
  Alfonso Thomas
  Shaun Tait
  Dirk Nannes
  Brad Hodge

Category A ($50,000): 

  Umar Gul
  Abdul Razzaq
  Wahab Riaz
  Mohammad Sami
  Kamran Akmal
  Umar Akmal
  Azhar Mahmood
  Ravi Bopara
  Phil Mustard
  Dwayne Smith
  Shivnarine Chanderpaul
  Yasir Arafat
  Ryan ten Doeschate
  Peter Trego

Sold players

Unsold players
The following is a list of players who remained unsold in the auction.

  Aaron O'Brien
  Cameron Borgas
  Dirk Nannes
  Lee Carseldine
  Abdul Majid
  Abu Jayed
  Abu Haider
  Abul Bashar
  Amit Kumar
  Amit Majumder
  Arafat Salahuddin
  Ariful Haque
  Arman Badsha
  Arman Hossain
  Asif Ahmed
  Avishek Mitra
  Bishawnath Halder
  Delwar Hossain
  Dewan Sabbir
  Ezaz Ahmed
  Faisal Hossain
  Fariduddin Masud
  Fazle Rabbi
  Kamrul Islam Rabbi
  Kazi Kamrul Islam
  Mahbubul Karim
  Mahmudul Hasan
  Monir Hossain
  Monwer Hossain
  Murad Khan
  Maisur Rahman
  Nadif Chowdhury
  Nafees Iqbal
  Nasir Uddin Faruque
  Nazmus Sadat
  Noor Hossain
  Robiul Islam
  Rajin Saleh
  Rassal Al-Mamun
  Rejaul Karim Rajib
  Rony Talukdar
  Rubiayat Haq
  Saikat Ali
  Sajidul Islam
  Saju Datta
  Sahgir Hossain
  Sharifullah
  Shuvashish Roy
  Syed Rasel
  Talha Jubair
  Tanbir Hayder
  Tareq Aziz
  Tarik Ahmed
  Tasamul Haque
  Taskin Ahmed
  Tushar Imran
  Ashley Nurse
  Corey Collymore
  Kirk Edwards
  Sulieman Benn
  Rizwan Cheema
  Andy Carter
  Bilal Shafayat
  Chris Schofield
  Dimitri Mascarenhas
  Jack Shantry
  Majid Haq
  Peter Trego
  Rikki Clarke
  Sajid Mahmood
  Tim Groenewald
  Usman Afzaal
  Andre Fletcher
  Assad Fudadin
  Shivnarine Chanderpaul
  Irfan Ahmed
  Gary Wilson
  Niall O'Brien
  Brendon Nash
  Danza Hyatt
  Ricardo Powell
  Xavier Marshall
  Carlton Baugh
  Sheldon Cottrell
  Alexei Kervezee
  Mudassar Bukhari
  Stephan Myburgh
  Michael Swart
  Tonito Willett
  Adeel Malik
  Adnan Rajak
  Adnan Raza
  Ali Asad
  Ali Khan
  Anop Ravi
  Asad Shafiq
  Asif Raza
  Babar Naeem
  Bilawal Bhatti
  Haris Sohail
  Iftikhar Anjum
  Junaid Zia
  Kamran Shahzad
  Kamran Younis
  Khurram Manzoor
  Mansoor Amjad
  Mohammad Irshad
  Mohammad Khalil
  Mohammad Salman
  Naved Arif
  Rahat Ali
  Raza Ali Dar
  Rehan Riaz
  Saeed Anwar Jr
  Samiullah Khan
  Sarfraz Ahmed
  Shahid Yousuf
  Shakeel Ansar
  Shoaib Khan
  Sohail Ahmed
  Yasir Arafat
  Zohaib Khan
  Kyle Coetzer
  Calum MacLeod
  Preston Mommsen
  Alfonso Thomas
  Charles Peiterson
  Neil Carter
  Kaushal Lokuarachchi
  Malinga Bandara
  Akeal Hosein
  Rayad Emrit
  Samuel Badree
  Denesh Ramdin
  Charles Coventry
  Elton Chigumbura
  Gary Ballance
  Malcolm Waller
  Prosper Utseya
  Vusi Sibanda

Post-auction signings
Franchises are able sign  players after the BPL auction, as replacement of contracted players who are not available to play due to injuries and national commitments. Under BPL rules, the replacements have to be chosen from the pool of players who went unsold in the auction, and cannot be paid more than the players they are replacing, though they can be paid less. The Pakistan Cricket Board refused to issue No Objection Certificates (NOC) to any of its player who were selected by the BPL franchises and therefore Pakistani cricketers will not take part in the 2013 Bangladesh Premier League.

See also
2013 Bangladesh Premier League
2012-13 Bangladeshi cricket season

References

Cricket player auction lists
2013 Bangladesh Premier League